Maurus Esteva Alsina or Maur Esteva i Alsina, OCist 1933-2014 was the Abbot general of the Common observance between 1995–2010.

Career 
He was born in Catalonia, Spain, and entered in 1958 to the community of the Royal Abbey of Santa Maria de Poblet, he studied in Rome. 
He was elected abbot in 1970, during end of the Franquisme and restoration of the Monarchy in Spain. During this period of 25 years the abbey flourished and was restored. In 1995 he succeeded Ferenc Polikárp Zakar as Abbot general of the Common observance. 
He was succeeded in 2010 by Mauro-Giuseppe Lepori. He died in the Royal abbey of Poblet.

Ordinations 
 Anselm van der Linde

Author 
 Poblet, escola de servei: sermons capitulars

References

Cistercian abbots general